Coray is a commune in the Finistère department of Brittany in north-western France.

It lies on the river Odet.

Geography

Climate
Coray has a oceanic climate (Köppen climate classification Cfb).

Population
Inhabitants of Coray are called in French Corayens.

Map

See also
Communes of the Finistère department

References

External links

Official website 

Mayors of Finistère Association 

Communes of Finistère